Sunset Grill is a Canadian-based fast food restaurant chain specializing in breakfast items.

The restaurant was founded in 1985 by Angelo Christou in The Beaches neighbourhood of Toronto, Ontario.  As of March, 2019, they have more than 80 locations in southern Ontario, mostly in the Greater Toronto and Hamilton area.

References

External link
Sunset Grill

1985 establishments in Ontario
Fast-food chains of Canada
Restaurants established in 1985